The Chactidae are a family of scorpions established by Reginald Innes Pocock in 1893. They make up the superfamily Chactoidea.

Genera 
Chactidae contains the following genera:
Anuroctonus Pocock, 1893
Auyantepuia (Gonzalez-Sponga, 1978)
Broteochactas Pocock, 1893
Brotheas C.L. Koch, 1837
Chactas Gervais, 1844
Chactopsis Kraepelin, 1912
Chactopsoides Ochoa, Rojas-Runjaic, Pinto-Da-Rocha & Prendini, 2013
Guyanochactas Lourenco, 1998
Hadrurochactas Pocock, 1893
Megachactops Ochoa, Rojas-Runjaic, Pinto-Da-Rocha & Prendini, 2013
Neochactas Soleglad & Fet, 2003
Nullibrotheas Williams, 1974
Spinochactas Lourenço, 2016
Teuthraustes Simon, 1878
Uroctonus Thorell, 1876
Vachoniochactas Gonzalez-Sponga, 1978

References

Scorpion families